Death Wish 4: The Crackdown is a 1987 American action thriller film, and the fourth installment in the Death Wish film series. The film was directed by J. Lee Thompson, and features Charles Bronson, who reprises his leading role as Paul Kersey. In the film, Kersey is once again forced to become a vigilante after his girlfriend's daughter dies of a drug overdose. He is recruited by a tabloid owner, Nathan White (John P. Ryan) to take down various crime figures of the Los Angeles drug trade.

Michael Winner, who directed the first three films in the series, was replaced by J. Lee Thompson. Death Wish 4: The Crackdown had a substantially lower budget and a more limited release than its predecessors. It was released in North America on November 6, 1987. The Bollywood film Mohra is an unofficial remake of the film. The film marks the seventh collaboration between Bronson and director J. Lee Thompson (following 1976's St. Ives, 1977's The White Buffalo, 1980's Caboblanco, 1983's 10 to Midnight, 1984's The Evil That Men Do, and 1986's Murphy's Law).

Plot
Roughly one year after the events of the previous film, Paul Kersey is back in Los Angeles and is living a quiet life as an architect at his own firm, haunted by nightmares of his past as a vigilante. Erica, the teenage daughter of Karen Sheldon, Paul's current girlfriend, goes with her boyfriend, Randy, to an arcade to meet up with a man named JoJo Ross. JoJo offers her crack cocaine, and Erica dies from an overdose. Having seen Erica smoke a joint with Randy while in his car the previous night, Paul suspects Randy was involved with Erica's death, so he follows him to the arcade. Randy confronts JoJo, only to be killed by him before Paul shoots and kills him. At home, Paul receives a package indicating the sender knows he's "the vigilante," and a phone call threatening to go to the police if Paul won't meet. Paul is taken to the mansion of the secretive tabloid publisher Nathan White. White says that his daughter became addicted to drugs and eventually died of an overdose, so he wants to hire Paul to wipe out the drug trade in Los Angeles. There are two major gangs competing for the local drug supply: one led by Ed Zacharias, the other by brothers Jack and Tony Romero. Kersey accepts and White supplies him with weapons and information. Meanwhile, LA detectives Sid Reiner and Phil Nozaki investigate the arcade deaths.

Paul infiltrates Zacharias' manor as a party bartender. After bugging a phone, he witnesses Zacharias murder a colleague before being discovered by him. He orders Paul to help carry out the dead body while motioning to one of his henchmen to kill Paul when they're done, but Paul kills him and escapes. Paul proceeds to kill three of Ed Zacharias' enforcers, Art Sanella, Danny Moreno and Jack Stein at a restaurant with a bomb in a wine bottle, drug dealer Max Green, and Romeros' top hitman Frank Bauggs. A few days later, White instructs Paul to go to San Pedro, where a local fisherman wharf acts as a front for Zacharias's drug operations. Breaking in, Paul kills the criminals and blows up the drug processing room with a time bomb. Nozaki reveals himself to be a corrupt cop working for Zacharias, and demands that Paul tell him who he works for, but Paul kills him. He lures Zacharias and the Romero brothers into a trap, leading to a shootout in which both cartels are completely destroyed and Zacharias is personally killed by Paul. White congratulates him, but then sets him up with a car bomb, which Paul narrowly escapes. Enraged, Paul returns to the White Manor only to find a stranger who claims to be the real Nathan White; the impersonator who hired Paul was actually a third drug lord who used him to dispose of the rival cartels. Paul is approached by two cops, who arrest him, but he recognizes them as fakes, causes their car to flip over and flees.

To get rid of Paul, the Nathan White impersonator kidnaps and uses Karen as a bait. Reiner waits inside Paul's apartment to kill him out of vengeance for Nozaki's alleged murder, but Paul knocks him out. He arms himself with a rifle fitted with a grenade launcher and goes to the meeting place designated by the drug lord, the parking lot of White's commercial building. After killing many of his men, Paul follows White into a roller rink and kills the rest of his gang, before confronting him and Karen on the roof. Karen breaks free and attempts to escape, but White kills her, with Paul firing his last grenade at him in return. Reiner arrives and orders him to surrender, but Paul simply walks away, proclaiming: "Do whatever you have to". Reiner decides to let him go.

Cast

 Charles Bronson as Paul Kersey/Mr Vigilante
 Kay Lenz as Karen Sheldon
 John P. Ryan as Ferrari / Fake Nathan White
 Perry Lopez as Ed Zacharias
 Mike Moroff as Jack Romero
 Dan Ferro as Tony Romero
 George Dickerson as Detective Sid Reiner
 Soon-Tek Oh as Detective Phil Nozaki
 Gerald Castillo as Lieutenant Higuera
 Dana Barron as Erica Sheldon
 Jesse Dabson as Randy Viscovich
 Danny Trejo as Art Sanella
 Daniel Sabia as Al Arroyo
 Michael Russo as Danny Moreno
 James Purcell as Vincent Montono
 Peter Sherayko as Nick Franco
 David Fontano as Frank Bauggs
 Tom Everett as Max Green
 Hector Mercado as Joe "Jo-Jo" Ross
 Tim Russ as Jesse
 Mark Pellegrino as Punk
 Mitch Pileggi as Cannery Lab Foreman
 Irwin Keyes as Joey, Bauggs' Chauffeur
 Richard Aherne as Nathan White

Production

Development

Cannon Films announced the creation of a new sequel to Death Wish in 1986, estimating that it would be ready for release by spring 1987. Although, the film company was by this point facing financial problems. Its greatest box office hit was still Missing in Action (1984) with $38 million domestic gross. Cannon had lost money through box office flops such as Pirates (1986). Consequently, they tightened the budgets of upcoming films to under $5 million per film. When it came to a screenplay for the film, there were several available. Writing duties were ultimately assigned to Gail Morgan Hickman, who had previously contributed rejected scripts for Death Wish 3 (1985). Hickman's first script, which had Paul Kersey struggling with a crisis of conscience and trying to reconnect with Geri Nichols (Jill Ireland) from Death Wish II, was rejected because Ireland was battling breast cancer. The second script, which had Kersey going after an international terrorist, was rejected due to its premise having similarities to Wanted: Dead or Alive (1987). The final script had the premise of Kersey playing two gangs against each other. Hickman was influenced by the use of this premise in the films Yojimbo (1961) and A Fistful of Dollars (1964). Hickman also came up with the idea of a millionaire benefactor for Kersey, with both of them having lost a daughter (surrogate in Kersey's case) to the deadly effects of the illegal drug trade. Kohner found this an interesting idea in need of a plot twist. Hickman came up with the idea of the millionaire being a drug lord who is using Kersey to eliminate his competition. According to Hickman, he also understood that Cannon producers Menahem Golan and Yoram Globus "wanted a mindless movie with nonstop action", so he came up with "cartoonish" action scenes. Hickman revised his screenplay from February to March 1987, during which time he wrote from 9a.m. to 9p.m. on a daily basis. Hickman toyed with the idea of giving Kersey a surrogate son called Eric, to avoid repetition in having the character lose another daughter. He changed his mind and turned Eric into Erica, because he felt that the death of a girl would be a stronger echo to the original loss in Kersey's life. Hickman was also the father of a daughter and could better understand the agony of losing a girl. During filming, Bronson requested further rewrites of certain elements of dialogue and action scenes. Hickman recalled going through several rewrites on a daily basis. An earlier draft had Paul living in Los Angeles with a new girlfriend. She was subsequently murdered by crooks. Paul, fighting the urge to return to his vigilante ways, captures the crooks and hands them over to the police, but when the crooks walk on a technicality, Paul becomes the vigilante once more, and hunts them down. One by one. Cannon felt this take on the series was too cerebral and didn't feature enough action. Ultimately, a more conventional storyline was chosen.

Casting

For Death Wish 4, Cannon reached an agreement with an independent producer, Pancho Kohner, son of Paul Kohner. The senior Kohner was the agent of Charles Bronson. Pancho himself had produced (or co-produced) seven previous Bronson films, including St. Ives (1976), The White Buffalo (1977), Love and Bullets (1979), 10 to Midnight (1983), The Evil That Men Do (1984), Murphy's Law (1986), and Assassination (1987). Death Wish 4 was the first film in the series not to be directed by Michael Winner, who was occupied filming Appointment with Death (1988). Even so, Winner expressed no interest in directing Death Wish 4 because Bronson was displeased with their previous collaboration on Death Wish 3. Both Bronson and Kohner had in mind assigning directorial duties to J. Lee Thompson, who had worked with them in several previous films, and had also had a good working relationship with the producers of Cannon Films. Bronson was offered 4 million dollars to reprise his role, more than a half of the film's entire budget. The temperamental star voiced his displeasure frequently to the writer, Gail Morgan Hickman during the production of Death Wish 4. "Charlie was a guy who could be impulsive and unpredictable," Hickman says. "Every day, we would show up on the set and Charlie would apart what he was to shoot. He would say, 'This sucks.' We would quickly go over the morning shoot. You couldn't [change] that much, because they were ready to shoot, but we would make some reparations to the dialogue. Then, in between takes, we would go over the pages for the afternoon shoot and Charlie would say, 'This sucks'; 'This is stupid'; 'I don't like this'; 'I hate this line here'; 'Why can't he say this". The villain "Nathan White" was played by John P. Ryan. Golan hired him after loving his work in Runaway Train (1985) and Ryan would say himself that he also loved working with "the Cannon duo". Erica's actor, Dana Barron said that "The cast was amazing. Everyone was happy to be there. We felt like we were continuing the [Death Wish] legacy".

Filming

The previous three films of the series featured youthful street punks as villains, while the fourth covered new ground featuring adult representatives of organized crime. Principal photography was originally scheduled to begin in January 1987. However, the start was delayed for March 1987, but was delayed once again. The delays were due to stipulations in a line-of-credit agreements that prohibited The Cannon Group, Inc. from having more than two movies in principal photography at the same time. Warner Communications Inc. had guaranteed a $25-million line of credit for the financially troubled Cannon Group, Inc. in December 1986. Finally, the filming started on April 13, 1987, and most of the scenes were filmed all around Los Angeles.

Music
Due to the financial problems that Cannon Group, inc. suffered, most of the music was re-used from the previous films of the company, including 10 to Midnight (1983) and Missing in Action (1984). However, some of the music was composed by John Bisharat and a partner duo, Paul and Valentine McCallum.

Release

Home media
Media Home Entertainment released the film on video in April 1988, having agreed with Cannon to a 2 million dollars advance. Over 100,000 cassettes were sold to rental stores. It was the best selling entry of the series in the video market.

Reception

Box office
The film debuted at No. 6. It brought a profit of nearly $2 million out of the other $5 million it grossed (the equivalent of $14,550,159 in 2016 dollars).

According to Film Inquiry, "On a budget of $5 million, the film only procured a lowly sum of just under $7 million, adding to the large list of financial failures for the Cannon group who were on the verge of collapsing."

Critical response
Caryn James of The New York Times criticized the "cartoon thin" characters and the fact that the hero is essentially a dangerous sociopath, but concluded that the film serves as solid entertainment for those willing to suspend their sense of moral outrage. Kevin Thomas commented that while the film's plot is "preposterous" and its characters thin, it serves as "a solid textbook example of crisp exploitation picture craftsmanship." He credited this mainly to director J. Lee Thompson having a strong sense of efficiency and humor, ensuring that hero Paul Kersey's apparent invincibility makes the audience laugh in a way that is "friendly rather than derisive." Variety poked fun at Paul Kersey's approach to eliminating the drug trade but summed up the film with "What raises Death Wish 4 above the usual blowout is a semi-engaging script and sure pacing by veteran action director J. Lee Thompson." Richard Harrington of The Washington Post poorly reviewed the film, citing the rudimentary and predictable plot, amateurish dialogue, inept villains, lack of tension, mindless violence, and Charles Bronson's weak performance. In the UK film magazine Film Review, critic James Cameron Wilson praised director J. Lee Thompson's vision saying that "it's flashy without being distracting and more or less gets on with the job of storytelling." He also criticised the script, noting it needed to be smartened up, but preferred Thompson's direction over the original director Michael Winner.

References

External links
 
 
 
 

Death Wish (film series)
1987 films
1987 action thriller films
1980s vigilante films
American action thriller films
1980s English-language films
Films about drugs
Films about the illegal drug trade
Films about cocaine
Films directed by J. Lee Thompson
Films set in Los Angeles
Golan-Globus films
American sequel films
Films with screenplays by Gail Morgan Hickman
Films scored by John Bisharat
1980s American films